Amanda Dudamel Newman (born 19 October 1999) is a Venezuelan fashion designer, model, philanthropist, and beauty pageant titleholder who was crowned Miss Venezuela 2021. She represented the Region Andina at the pageant. She also represented Venezuela at the Miss Universe 2022 competition placing as the 1st Runner-Up.

Early and personal life
Amanda Dudamel was born in Mérida, Mérida in Venezuela. Aside from being raised in Mérida and Yaracuy, Dudamel spent her childhood in a variety of countries such as Canada, Colombia, Chile and South Africa, where she learned to speak English. She is the daughter of Rafael Dudamel, a Venezuelan former footballer from San Felipe, Yaracuy, and Nahir Newman Torres, a Venezuelan architect and real estate agent from Mérida, Mérida.

Amanda studied her professional career in fashion design in the city of Rome, Italy, where she lived for several years and learned to speak Italian fluently, one of the three languages she speaks (in addition to English and Spanish).She is the owner and executive director of her own clothing brand "By Amanda Dudamel" and co-founder of the brand "Reborn the Brand", as well as director of the social impact project "Emprendiendo e Impactando".

She is the Creative Director of Made in Petare, an accessories brand that was created to financially support the “Un Par Por Un Sueño” foundation. Together with them, through the development and sale of products, they contribute to the work of the foundation where more than 1000 children are fed daily in different dining rooms in Petare (Venezuela), the largest neighborhood in Latin America. They also include mothers as part of the process, offering them training and job opportunities that allow them to empower themselves and support their families financially; and simultaneously perform recreational activities for children.

Pageantry

Miss Venezuela 2021 
At the end of Miss Venezuela 2021 held on October 28, 2021, Dudamel was crowned Miss Venezuela 2021.

Dudamel is the third Miss Venezuela from the state of Mérida, along with Ana Griselda Vegas Miss Venezuela 1961 and Stefanía Fernández Miss Venezuela 2008 and Miss Universe 2009.

On November 18, 2021, Dudamel held her first show as a fashion designer in Venezuela with her clothing brand REBORN THE BRAND.

In January 2022, she participated in a commercial for hair care brand Drene.

On May 24, 2022, she was modeling in the fashion show of the spring summer collection, entitled Canto a Caracas (I sing to Caracas) the Venezuelan fashion designer Giovanni Scutaro.

During her reign as Miss Venezuela, she created her social project, entitled "Dale play al éxito" (play success) training program where she has worked with a group of men and women, in the agricultural sector, Petare located in the state of Miranda (Venezuela).  

She also launched her digital platform, which is called "Voice Across The Universe" where she has interviewed several candidates for Miss Universe, among which are the representatives of: Argentina, Brazil, Korea, Curaçao, Colombia, Spain, the Philippines, Ghana, Panama, Kosovo, Mexico, Honduras, India, Indonesia, Italy, Paraguay, Portugal, Ukraine, and Uruguay.

Miss Universe 2022 
She represented Venezuela in the Miss Universe 2022 placing as the 1st Runner-Up. This is the highest placement Venezuela has achieved since Gabriela Isler's win as Miss Universe 2013.

References

External links
 

Living people
1999 births
Venezuelan beauty pageant winners
Venezuelan female models
People from Mérida, Mérida
Miss Universe 2022 contestants
Miss Venezuela winners